Chris Owen (born 21 December 1963) is an Australian cricketer. He played in eight first-class matches for South Australia between 1989 and 1992.

See also
 List of South Australian representative cricketers

References

External links
 

1963 births
Living people
Australian cricketers
South Australia cricketers
Cricketers from Adelaide